Leonardo Lavalle and Jorge Lozano were the defending champions, but lost in the first round to Patrick Galbraith and Anders Järryd.

Galbraith and Järryd won the title by defeating Steve DeVries and David Macpherson 7–6, 6–2 in the final.

Seeds

Draw

Draw

References

External links
 Official results archive (ATP)
 Official results archive (ITF)

1991 ABN AMRO World Tennis Tournament
1991 ATP Tour